Mustafa Nader Al-Mandalawi (born October 18, 1995) is an Iraqi journalist, painter, photographer and blogger. He has been working in the digital content industry since 2010, as well as working as a press reporter. He worked as director of digital content in institutions and local agencies. He makes short films expressing peace and coexistence.

Nader is a blogger and an influential figure in social media, where he leads the campaign "Fighting Cancer" in Iraq. In 2014, he was treated for cancer. He is active in the field of cancer awareness for early detection in partnership with humanitarian teams and health institutions.  He established a team of cancer survivors to spread their success stories against the disease.

Early life
Nader was born in Baghdad. He completed his primary education in Baghdad schools and then graduated from the Department of Fine Arts Painting at the Institute of Fine Arts in 2016.

Teaching
He started teaching in elementary schools free of charge as a volunteer teacher since 2013.

Cancer
Nader was diagnosed with cancer in 2014, when he was 20 years old. He discovered his disease through a routine check and discovered that he had cancer Tumor. During his struggle, he worked to change the views of society around the disease, and he urges people who have cancer to treat it instead of surrendering and waiting for death. Nader did not consider himself a patient but a "cancer fighter". Despite the severity of the disease, he stayed positive and shared the news with his friends. He published the news on Facebook, where he has earned more than 100,000 followers. After fighting cancer for nearly a year, he went into remission in 2015. He then earned his nickname "Cancer warrior".

Awards
Nader earned an award for Short documentaries at the United Nations in 2018 after the announcement of his last film, which talks about the story of a young man from Mosul and his journey in salvation. His film When Words Fall, Music Speaks was chosen as the best film at the United Nations Film Festival. He received a prize at the WFYS festival in the Russian city of Sochi.

References

1995 births
Living people
Iraqi bloggers
People from Baghdad
Male bloggers
Iraqi journalists
Iraqi painters